William Phillimore Watts Phillimore (formerly Stiff) MA BCL  (27 October 1853 – 9 April 1913) was an English solicitor, genealogist and publisher.

Early life
William Phillimore Watts Stiff was born on 27 October 1853 in Nottingham, the eldest son of Dr William Phillimore Stiff M.B. Lond., M.R.C.S. Eng., of Sneinton, Nottingham, afterwards superintendent of Nottingham General Lunatic Asylum, and Mary Elizabeth, daughter of Benjamin Watts of Bridgen Hall, Bridgnorth, Shropshire. In 1873 William Stiff senior changed the family surname by royal licence to Phillimore, his great-grandmother's maiden name. William junior studied at The Queen's College, Oxford, and was awarded a second-class degree in Jurisprudence in 1876.

Career
Phillimore was a solicitor. In 1897 he founded the publishing business which bears his name. From 1888 onwards, he advocated the formation of local record offices, and to that end prepared bills to be put before Parliament.

Phillimore initiated the foundation of several record publication societies: the Index Library (afterwards the germ of the British Record Society) in 1887; the Scottish Record Series (afterwards Scottish Record Society) in 1896; the Thoroton Society of Nottinghamshire in 1897; the Canterbury and York Society in 1904, publishers of English medieval ecclesiastical records; and the Irish Record Society in 1909. He was a corresponding member of the New England Historic Genealogical Society, the Virginia Historical Society, and the Chicago Historical Society.

Personal life and death
Phillimore married Jane Graham in 1887 and they left one surviving son, Wilfred Henderson Phillimore.

Phillimore died on 9 April 1913 in Torquay, Devon.

Legacy
The publishing house he founded, Phillimore & Co., later based in Chichester, West Sussex, became a prominent publisher in the fields of local history and family history, and survives as an imprint of The History Press.

Works

Authored by Phillimore
Nottinghamshire Church Bells (1872)
[https://archive.org/details/memorialsoffamil00phil Memorials of the family of Fynmore: with notes on the origin of Fynmore, Finnimore, Phillimore, Fillmore, Filmer, etc., and particulars of some of those surnames from the year 1208, to the present time] (1886)
How to Write the History of a Family (1887)
Pedigree Work (1900)
The Family of Middlemore (1901)
The Family of Holbrow (1901)
Heralds' College and Coats of Arms regarded from a Legal Aspect (1904)
Law and Practice of Grant of Arms (1905)
Changes of Name (1906)
The Family of Phillimore (completed by Lord Phillimore, and published in 1922).

Edited by Phillimore
1297 Coram Rege Roll
Rotuli Hugonis de Welles, episcopi Lincolniensis 1209-1235
Irish Will Calendars
County Pedigrees: Nottinghamshire
upwards of 200 volumes of Parish Registers, Inquisitions, Will Calendars (chronological lists of wills) etc.
Gloucestershire Notes and Queries

Sources 

Who Was Who, 1897–1916 A & C Black Ltd, 1920
The Genealogist, vol. 30 (October 1913)

References

English genealogists
English book publishers (people)
1853 births
1913 deaths
People from Sneinton
People from Nottingham
Alumni of The Queen's College, Oxford
19th-century English businesspeople